The 2020–21 Dhivehi Premier League is the 6th season of the Premier League, the top Maldivian professional league for association football clubs since its establishment in 2015. Maziya are the defending champions, having won their third league title the previous season, their second in the Premier League era, having last won in 2016. The season was initially scheduled to start in June, but this was delayed until December as a consequence of the delay of the 2020 AFC Cup and 2022 FIFA World Cup qualifiers due to the outbreak of COVID-19 pandemic in Asia and in the Maldives.

Teams

Initially, ten teams were set to compete in the league – the top eight teams from the previous season and the two teams promoted from the Second Division. The promoted teams are Club Valencia and Super United Sports. On 22 July 2020, Football Association of Maldives announced that this season will be held with eight teams. This is due to temporarily holding off the Premier League slots for the teams promoting from the Jazeera Championship as the 2020 edition was called off due to COVID-19 pandemic in the Maldives, meaning Foakaidhoo FC and Nilandhoo Sports Club are forced to play in the 2021 Jazeera Championship even though they survived relegation.

Valencia is returning after a season's absence in the first division (three seasons in Premier League). This is the first season in the Premier League for Super United Sports. They replaced Victory Sports Club and New Radiant (both teams relegated after suspension due to financial reasons).

Teams and their divisions
''Note: Table lists clubs in alphabetical order.

Personnel
Note: Flags indicate national team as has been defined under FIFA eligibility rules. Players may hold more than one non-FIFA nationality.

Coaching changes

Foreign players

 Players name in bold indicates the player is registered during the mid-season transfer window.
 Foreign players who left their clubs or were de-registered from playing squad due to medical issues or other matters.

League table

References

Dhivehi Premier League seasons
Maldives
1
1
Dhiveni Premier League, 2020-21